Lelu or Lelu Town is a municipality of the state of Kosrae, in the Federated States of Micronesia.

The municipality of Lelu consists of Lelu Island (a small satellite island of Kosrae Island) and a big part of the northeastern portion of Kosrae Island. Its capital is Lelu Village, located on Lelu island. Another village in the municipality, on Kosrae Island, is Tofol, the capital of the state of Kosrae. Established as a Town since Jan. 1989.

Education
Kosrae State Department of Education operates public schools in the municipality:
 Kosrae High School (Tofol)
 Lelu Elementary School (Lelu Island)
 Sansrihk Elementary School - Lelu Municipality

Climate
Lelu has a tropical rainforest climate (Af) with very heavy rainfall year-round.

References

Municipalities of Kosrae
1989 establishments in the Federated States of Micronesia